The Morgan State–Towson rivalry, known as The Battle for Greater Baltimore, is a football game between Morgan State University and Towson University.

Game results

See also 
 List of NCAA college football rivalry games

References

College football rivalries in the United States
Morgan State Bears football
Towson Tigers football